Jens Tang Olesen (born 27 September 1947) is a Danish football manager. He was most recently in charge of the Greenland national football team

He has previously managed Viborg FF, Randers Freja, FC Aarhus and Vejle Boldklub.

In 2003, he was briefly Director of Sports at FC Aarhus.

In 1982, he was named Danish Football Manager of the Year in 1982.

References

1947 births
Living people
Danish football managers
Viborg FF managers
Aarhus Fremad managers
Vejle Boldklub managers
Boldklubben 1913 managers